Alison Wedding (born 1972) is an American singer and composer based in New York City.

Career 
She has performed with jazz musicians Gerry Mulligan, Dianne Reeves, Joe Chindamo, Bob Sedergreen, and Peter Knight. Before moving to New York in 2007, Wedding was based in Melbourne from 2001 to 2007 where she performed and recorded throughout Australia. She holds a degree from the University of North Texas. Her album, This Dance was produced by Michael League of Snarky Puppy and featured special guests Lionel Loueke, Chris Potter, and Theo Bleckmann.

Australian Jazz Bell Awards
The Australian Jazz Bell Awards, (also known as the Bell Awards or The Bells), are annual music awards for the jazz music genre in Australia. They commenced in 2003.

|-
| 2004
| The Secret
| Best Australian Jazz Vocal Album
| 
|-

Discography

As leader
 The Secret, ABC Jazz (2003)
 Sometimes I Feel, Jazzhead (Australian label) (2004)
 Live at the BMW Edge (2004) 
 This Dance, GroundUP/Ropeadope (2012)

As guest
 Cathy Segal-Garcia, background vocals on Secret Life, Dash Hoffman (label) (2001)
 Peter Knight, Between Two Moments, New Market (Australian label) (2001)
  Andy Summers, Peggy's Blue Skylight, vocals on "Remember Rockefeller at Attica", BMG/RCA Victor (2002)
 Mark Lockett, About Time, Move Records (2004)
 Gabriel Espinosa, From Yucatan to Rio, ZOHO Music L.L.C. (2008)
 Hendrik Meurkens (de) and Gabriel Espinosa, Celebrando, ZOHO Music L.L.C. (2011)
 Hendrik Meurkens (de) and Gabriel Espinosa, Samba Little Samba, ZOHO Music L.L.C. (2013)
 Michael Reinhart, background vocals on Echo, And Sum Music (label) (2013)

References

External links
  Alison Wedding official website

Living people
1972 births
American women pop singers
American women jazz singers
American jazz singers
Jazz-pop singers
People from Dallas
Torch singers
University of North Texas College of Music alumni
21st-century American women singers
Jazz musicians from Texas
21st-century American singers